The murder of Shamil Odamanov is a viral beheading video in which two captured Russian men are shown to be murdered by decapitation and gunfire. It was uploaded on YouTube by the members of Russian neo-Nazi groups in 2007. Widely known as The Russian neo-Nazi beheading video (Russian: Казнь таджика и дагестанца - The Execution of a Tajiki and a Dagestani), the incident was considered a cold case until 2020.

Video description 

The video begins with a swastika on a red digital background accompanied by the song "Русь" by the Russian folk metal band Arkona. The camera focuses on a landscape and displays the text "Operation of the NSPR for the arrest and execution of two colonists from Dagestan and Tajikistan. 2007". Shortly afterward the camera focuses on the victims who are both tied up with hands and feet both behind their back. The music fades. While on their knees they say in their native Russian "We were arrested by Russian national socialists." The camera then closes up on the face of the first victim. Behind him stands a man wearing a camouflage suit with a serrated knife in his right hand. A cry - "Glory to Russia!" is heard, after which the killer begins to saw the head of his victim in quick movements. The action is accompanied by the sound of the spine being sawn. The next video is simply shot at close range in the back of the head, the body falls into a grave that was dug out in preparation. Electronic music is playing; two masked men perform the Nazi salute. The video ends with a shot of a concrete wall with the inscription "NSPR" in Russian with a swastika drawn next to it.

The appearance of the video and the first statement of the NSPR 

On August 12, 2007, on the LiveJournal blog platform of user vik23, a two-minute video entitled "Execution of a Tajik and a Dag" was posted, which captured the murder of two non Slavic young men. A few hours later, the video of the execution was posted on the news website of Russian ultra-radicals NS/WP (National Socialist White Power) and on the LiveJournal blog of the user antigipsyone. On August 13, the video was included in the top thirty most popular web searches of Russian search engine Yandex. The next day, August 14, on the news website of the Caucasian separatists Kavkaz Center, a statement was published by a hitherto unknown neo-Nazi group: NSPR (National Socialist Party of Russia), which claimed responsibility for the double murder:

This statement was also posted on the page of the LiveJournal user vik23, who was the first to publish the video. A day later, on August 15, a student of the Maikop State Technological University, Viktor Milkov (vik23), who, by his own admission, was a supporter of National Socialist ideas, came to the Prosecutor's Office of Adygea (Russia) and admitted to posting the video, claiming he received the video and posted it at the request of an unknown individual he met online, who introduced herself only as a "girl from Germany."

The Reaction of the Russian ultra nationalist groups 
On August 15, 2007, the press of the nationalist group National Socialist Society (N.S.S.), under whose auspices the double murder was allegedly committed, published a press release:

In response to an inquiry from Gazeta.Ru, the leader of the N.S.S Dmitry Rumyantsev said: "national Socialist Society doesn't take responsibility for the video published, but neither provide an official refutation of its involvement in the recording. There is nothing to comment on.  Everything is already very clear from the video". Leader of the Slavic Union, Dmitry Demushkin, implied that the video could have been filmed by Russian special services or members of radical Islamists groups to further discredit the ultra-right movement. Movement Against Illegal Immigration (DPNI) leader Aleksandr Belov suggested that the murder was committed either by the National Socialists or by the National Socialists with the help of special services. He believes that the theory that the video was filmed by the Caucasians themselves in order to discredit the Russian patriotic movement, should not even exist.

Video expertise 
A week after the publication of the video, on August 21, 2007, the head of the press center of the Ministry of Internal Affairs of the Russian Federation, Oleg Elnikov, said that the preliminary results of the video examination showed "obvious signs of editing." This ambiguous statement of the Ministry of Internal Affairs was interpreted by the media as confirmation of the theory voiced earlier (on August 16) by a source from the Ministry of Internal Affairs that the murder video was staged (fictional).

In June 2008, six months after one of the victims was identified, Vladimir Markin, an official representative at the Prosecutor's Office of the Russian Federation, said that the video was not a fabrication, but a real murder.

Identification of Shamil Odamanov and the Second Statement of the NSPR 

In January 2008, one of the two people killed in the video was identified by relatives. The young man who was beheaded in the video turned out to be a resident of the Dagestani village of Sultan-Yangi-Yurt, Shamil Umakhanovich Odamanov, who had moved to Moscow to work and with whom all contact was cut off in April 2007. The first mention about the identification of Shamil Odamanov appeared in February 2008 in the Dagestani weekly Chernovik, in Timur Mustafayev's article "Cinema and Murids". However, despite the widespread public response that the execution video had received, the first reports about it  on federal news channels appeared only four months later, in June 2008. A few days after the publication of Mustafayev's article, the so-called "Manifesto of the NSPR" appeared - written by a certain "commander Branislav". It followed from the manifesto that the statement of the NSPR, published in August 2007, was written "not by the real murderers." The real killers from the NSPR do not recognize any political leadership (of NSO and Rumyantsev) [32]. As evidence of his involvement in the murder,  "Branislav" attached two exclusive photos from the murder scene:

Investigation by Vlady Antonevicz 
In mid-2015, a documentary film "Credit for Murder", made by a graduate of the Jerusalem film school Vlady Antonevicz, introduced the theory that the double murder in the woods was committed by the members of the Russian neo-Nazi groups Format18 and the N.S.S. ("National Socialist Society"). In 2016, in an interview with Elena Fanailova (RadioSvoboda), Antonevicz openly named the three participants in the murder  - Maxim "Tesak" Martsinkevich, Sergei "Malyuta" Korotkikh and Dmitry Rumyantsev, specifying that Sergei "Malyuta" Korotkikh was the one who beheaded Shamil Odamanov, while Maxim "Tesak" Martsinkevich was filming. These conclusions were confirmed by the police in 2021. 

According to Antonevicz, at the end of a years long investigation, he wrote a letter to the President of the Russian Federation, Vladimir Putin, asking him to pay attention to this murder, after which he was invited to testify in the Investigative Committee in Moscow. The filmmaker considers Sergei "Malyuta" Korotkikh, one of the leaders of the N.S.S, to be an agent-provocateur who worked for the Russian FSB. Antonevicz connects the publication of the murder video with the wave of ethnic killings that swept Russia six months later, on the eve of the 2008 presidential elections.

Subsequent incidents 
In September 2020, the  leader of the neo-Nazi group Format18, Maxim "Tesak" Martsinkevich, who was serving a sentence for another case, was found dead in the cell of the remand prison No. 3 in Chelyabinsk. Investigative Committee spokesperson Svetlana Petrenko noted that "Tesak" had a "very serious" motive for suicide, as his involvement in the 2007 double murder was established. During the investigation, Martsinkevich gave testimony in eight more murder cases that were not known until then. In particular, Martsinkevich reported on the murders of the early 2000s and the involvement of other well known neo-Nazi members: Semyon ("Bооs") Tokmakov, Maxim Khotulev, Pavel Myshkin, Mikhail Mozhaev, Artem ("Kostyl") Kostylev, Andrey Chuenkov ("Grandfather"), Alexander Filyushkin ("Schultz"), Maxim Makienko ("Dentist") and others. Soon, a video of Tesak's last conversation with his lawyer was published on the Internet, in which he talks about some new "very old" allegations that he was presented with and from which he could not "escape" and a half-minute fragment of Tesak's conversation with the investigator in which he tells about other murders. On January 14, 2021, Vlady Antonevicz published a secret note that Tesak addressed to his closest accomplices, "Ded" (Andrey Chuenkov) and "Shultz" (Alexander Filyushkin), in which he warned that he had confessed to "basically everything" and suggested they leave the country at once

Sergei Korotkikh called the note an "FSB stuffing" to discredit his name. Tesak's accomplice, Artem Kostylev, whose name was mentioned by Martsinkevich, was soon found hanged in the forest.  Andrey Chuenkov ("Grandfather") and Alexander Filyushkin ("Shultz") fled to Ukraine. After Tesak's death, Vlady Antonevicz released a youtube video series ("Red Flags"), totaling two hours, in which he details his investigation and conclusions.

Charges 
In August 2021, the Investigative Committee of the Russian Federation brought charges of double murder in the forest against a neo-Nazi, associate of Tesak and ex-fighter of Azov, Sergei "Malyuta" Korotkikh. The investigation is still ongoing.

References 

2007 murders in Russia
Deaths by decapitation
Neo-Nazism in Russia
Beheading videos
Filmed executions
Kidnappings in Russia
Russian terrorism victims
Filmed killings